Guató is a possible language isolate spoken by 1% of the Guató people of Brazil.

Classification
Kaufman (1990) provisionally classified Guató as a branch of the Macro-Jê languages, but no evidence for this was found by Eduardo Ribeiro. Martins (2011) also suggests a relationship with Macro-Jê.

Language contact
Jolkesky (2016) notes that there are lexical similarities with the Bororo, Tupi, and Karib language families due to contact.

An automated computational analysis (ASJP 4) by Müller et al. (2013) found lexical similarities between Guató and the Zamucoan languages. However, since the analysis was automatically generated, the grouping could be either due to mutual lexical borrowing, genetic inheritance, or chance resemblances.

Distribution
In Mato Grosso do Sul, Brazil, Guató is spoken on the banks of the Paraguay River and up the São Lourenço River, along the Bolivian border. It is also spoken at Uberaba Lake in Santa Cruz Department (Bolivia).

Phonology
The Guató vowel system, like that of Macro-Jê languages, collapses a three-way distinction of height in oral vowels to two in nasal vowels.

Vocabulary
Loukotka (1968) lists the following basic vocabulary items for Guató.

{| class="wikitable sortable"
! gloss !! Guató
|-
| one || chenéhe
|-
| two || dúni
|-
| three || chumó
|-
| tooth || makuá
|-
| tongue || mundokuír
|-
| hand || mara
|-
| woman || muazya
|-
| water || mágũ
|-
| fire || matá
|-
| moon || múpina
|-
| maize || madzyéro
|-
| jaguar || mépago
|-
| house || movír
|}

For more extensive vocabulary lists of Guató by Palácio (1984) and Postigo (2009), see the corresponding Portuguese article.

References

Alain Fabre, 2005, Diccionario etnolingüístico y guía bibliográfica de los pueblos indígenas sudamericanos: GUATÓ.

Macro-Jê languages
Languages of Brazil
Indigenous languages of South America (Central)
Endangered indigenous languages of the Americas
Language isolates of South America